Richard Bekins (born July 17, 1954) is an American actor in theater, film, and television. 

One of his earliest roles was as Jamie Frame in the daytime soap opera Another World (1979–1983).

He has made numerous guest appearances on television series such as on CBS's Bull, Person of Interest, Elementary, Madam Secretary and The Good Wife. On NBC, he has appeared Law & Order, Law & Order: Special Victims Unit, and The Blacklist. Other television appearances include Mad Men, Daredevil, Madoff, The Path, Designated Survivor, Boardwalk Empire, Mr. Robot, and Younger.  On ABC, he appeared as the President in the pilot episode of the television series Designated Survivor in September 2016.

On film, he has been seen in Brother to Brother (2004), The Only Living Boy in New York, Young Adult, Limitless, Julie & Julia, and United 93.

Bekins has appeared on Broadway in Love! Valour! Compassion, Tartuffe : Born Again, and Happy New Year.

Off Broadway he has been seen in productions such as Somewhere Fun, Too Much Sun, The Chaos Theories, The Normal Heart, Birdy, and Patient A.

Filmography

Film

Television

References

External links

1954 births
Living people
American male film actors
American male soap opera actors
American male television actors
Male actors from Los Angeles County, California
20th-century American male actors
21st-century American male actors